The 2009 Tohoku Rakuten Golden Eagles season features the Eagles quest to win their first Pacific League title.

Regular season

Standings

Game log

|-align="center" bgcolor="bbffbb"
| 1 || April 3 || @Fighters || 1 - 3 || Iwakuma (1-0) || Darvish (0-1) || Arime (1) || 42,328 || 1-0-0
|-align="center" bgcolor="bbffbb"
| 2 || April 4 || @Fighters || 5 - 6 || Gwyn (1-0) || Fujii (0-1) || Kawagishi (1) || 36,316 || 2-0-0
|-align="center" bgcolor="bbffbb"
| 3 || April 5 || @Fighters || 6 - 9 (11) || Kawagishi (1-0) || Sakamoto (0-1) ||  || 34,252 || 3-0-0
|-align="center" bgcolor="bbffbb"
| 4 || April 7 || Hawks || 6 - 0 || Tanaka (1-0) || Loe (0-1) ||  || 17,281 || 4-0-0
|-align="center" bgcolor="#ffbbbb"
| 5 || April 8 || Hawks || 0 - 7 || Houlton (1-0) || Asai (0-1) ||  || 13,373 || 4-1-0
|-align="center" bgcolor="bbffbb"
| 6 || April 9 || Hawks || 2 - 1 || Nagai (1-0) || Otonari (0-1) || Koyama (1) || 12,418 || 5-1-0
|-align="center" bgcolor="#ffbbbb"
| 7 || April 10 || Lions || 0 - 6 || Wakui (2-0) || Iwakuma (1-1) ||  || 15,990 || 5-2-0
|-align="center" bgcolor="#ffbbbb"
| 8 || April 11 || Lions || 2 - 5 || Onodera (1-0) || Hasebe (0-1) || Graman (2) || 17,835 || 5-3-0
|-align="center" bgcolor="bbffbb"
| 9 || April 12 || Lions || 4 - 1 || Rasner (1-0) || Wasdin (0-1) ||  || 17,477 || 6-3-0
|-align="center" bgcolor="bbffbb"
| 10 || April 14 || @Marines || 1 - 2 || Tanaka (2-0) || Watanabe (0-1) ||  || 9,247 || 7-3-0
|-align="center" bgcolor="#ffbbbb"
| 11 || April 15 || @Marines || 7 - 1 || Karakawa (1-1) || Asai (0-2) ||  || 16,235 || 7-4-0
|-align="center" bgcolor="#ffbbbb"
| 12 || April 16 || @Marines || 11 - 7 (10) || Sikorski (2-1) || Koyama (0-1) ||  || 13,984 || 7-5-0
|-align="center" bgcolor="bbffbb"
| 13 || April 18 || @Buffaloes || 0 - 7 || Iwakuma (2-1) || Kondo (2-1) ||  || 20,598 || 8-5-0
|-align="center" bgcolor="#ffbbbb"
| 14 || April 19 || @Buffaloes || 15 - 0 || Kishida (2-0) || Rasner (1-1) ||  || 21,561 || 8-6-0
|-align="center" bgcolor="#bbbbbb"
| — || April 21 || Marines || colspan=6|Postponed (rained out)
|-align="center" bgcolor="bbffbb"
| 15 || April 22 || Marines || 2 - 0 || Tanaka (3-0) || Watanabe (0-2) ||  || 12,909 || 9-6-0
|-align="center" bgcolor="#ffbbbb"
| 16 || April 23 || Marines || 2 - 5 || Ono (1-1) || Hasebe (0-2) || Ogino (1) || 11,444 || 9-7-0
|-align="center" bgcolor="bbffbb"
| 17 || April 24 || @Hawks || 2 - 3 || Nagai (2-0) || Wada (1-2) || Gwyn (1) || 27,568 || 10-7-0
|-align="center" bgcolor="#ffbbbb"
| 18 || April 25 || @Hawks || 5 - 4 (11) || Mahara (1-0) || Asai (0-3) ||  || 31,021 || 10-8-0
|-align="center" bgcolor="bbffbb"
| 19 || April 26 || @Hawks || 0 - 4 || Rasner (2-1) || Sugiuchi (2-1) || Koyama (2) || 31,787 || 11-8-0
|-align="center" bgcolor="#ffbbbb"
| 20 || April 28 || Fighters || 2 - 4 || Yagi (1-0) || Kawai (0-1) || Takeda (5) || 13,326 || 11-9-0
|-align="center" bgcolor="bbffbb"
| 21 || April 29 || Fighters || 2 - 1 || Tanaka (4-0) || Takeda (1-1) ||  || 20,381 || 12-9-0
|-align="center" bgcolor="bbffbb"
| 22 || April 30 || Fighters || 4 - 2 || Hasebe (1-2) || Sweeney (0-2) || Arime (2) || 11,239 || 13-9-0
|-

|-align="center" bgcolor="bbffbb"
| 23 || May 1 || Buffaloes || 12 - 2 || Nagai (3-0) || Nakayama (0-2) ||  || 12,262 || 14-9-0
|-align="center" bgcolor="bbffbb"
| 24 || May 2 || Buffaloes || 7 - 3 || Iwakuma (3-1) || Komatsu (0-3) ||  || 20,246 || 15-9-0
|-align="center" bgcolor="bbffbb"
| 25 || May 3 || Buffaloes || 8 - 4 || Koyama (1-1) || Kishida (3-1) ||  || 20,619 || 16-9-0
|-align="center" bgcolor="#ffbbbb"
| 26 || May 4 || @Lions || 8 - 3 || Kishi (5-0) || Kawai (0-2) ||  || 33,911 || 16-10-0
|-align="center" bgcolor="bbffbb"
| 27 || May 5 || @Lions || 3 - 7 || Isaka (1-0) || Ishii (1-3) ||  || 33,908 || 17-10-0
|-align="center" bgcolor="bbffbb"
| 28 || May 6 || @Lions || 3 - 6 || Hasebe (2-2) || Nishiguchi (2-1) ||  || 31,440 || 18-10-0
|-align="center" bgcolor="#ffbbbb"
| 29 || May 8 || @Marines || 4 - 3 || Shimizu (1-2) || Nagai (3-1) || Ogino (3) || 13,263 || 18-11-0
|-align="center" bgcolor="bbffbb"
| 30 || May 9 || @Marines || 2 - 6 || Iwakuma (4-1) || Ono (1-3) ||  || 24,668 || 19-11-0
|-align="center" bgcolor="#ffbbbb"
| 31 || May 10 || @Marines || 6 - 0 || Karakawa (3-2) || Rasner (2-2) ||  || 24,023 || 19-12-0
|-align="center" bgcolor="#ffbbbb"
| 32 || May 12 || Fighters || 1 - 8 || Yagi (3-0) || Isaka (1-1) ||  || 10,231 || 19-13-0
|-align="center" bgcolor="bbffbb"
| 33 || May 13 || Fighters || 7 - 3 || Tanaka (5-0) || Sakamoto (0-2) ||  || 13,983 || 20-13-0
|-align="center" bgcolor="#ffbbbb"
| 34 || May 14 || Fighters || 0 - 7 || Sweeney (1-3) || Hasebe (2-3) ||  || 10,677 || 20-14-0
|-align="center" bgcolor="#ffbbbb"
| 35 || May 15 || Hawks || 2 - 4 || Falkenborg (2-0) || Koyama (1-2) || Mahara (5) || 11,338 || 21-14-0
|-align="center" bgcolor="bbffbb"
| 36 || May 16 || Hawks || 1 - 2 || Iwakuma (5-1) || Kamiuchi (2-1) ||  || 17,768 || 21-15-0
|-align="center" bgcolor="#bbbbbb"
| — || May 17 || Hawks || colspan=6|Postponed (rained out)
|-align="center" bgcolor="#ffbbbb"
| 37 || May 19 || Swallows || 3 - 7 || Ishikawa (6-1) || Rasner (2-3) ||  || 12,691 || 21-16-0
|-align="center" bgcolor="bbffbb"
| 38 || May 20 || Swallows || 2 - 0 || Tanaka (6-0) || Sato (2-3) ||  || 19,295 || 22-16-0
|-align="center" bgcolor="#ffbbbb"
| 39 || May 22 || Giants || 2 - 12 || Gonzalez (4-0) || Nagai (3-2) ||  || 20,170 || 22-17-0
|-align="center" bgcolor="#ffbbbb"
| 40 || May 23 || Giants || 1 - 7 || Utsumi (1-3) || Iwakuma (5-2) ||  || 20,599 || 22-18-0
|-align="center" bgcolor="bbffbb"
| 41 || May 24 || @BayStars || 2 - 5 || Hasebe (3-3) || Kobayashi (1-4) || Aoyama (1) || 18,041 || 23-18-0
|-align="center" bgcolor="#ffbbbb"
| 42 || May 25 || @BayStars || 6 - 5 || Kudoh (1-1) || Aoyama (0-1) ||  || 18,696 || 23-19-0
|-align="center" bgcolor="bbffbb"
| 43 || May 27 || @Dragons || 2 - 3 || Tanaka (7-0) || Takahashi (1-1) || Aoyama (2) || 32,208 || 24-19-0
|-align="center" bgcolor="#ffbbbb"
| 44 || May 28 || @Dragons || 2 - 1 (10) || Nagamine (1-0) || Aoyama (0-2) ||  || 28,262 || 24-20-0
|-align="center" bgcolor="#bbbbbb"
| — || May 30 || Carp || colspan=6|Postponed (rained out)
|-align="center" bgcolor="#ffbbbb"
| 45 || May 31 || Carp || 4 - 5 || Otake (5-1) || Iwakuma (5-3) || Nagakawa (15) || 18,015 || 24-21-0
|-

|-align="center" bgcolor="#ffbbbb"
| 46 || June 1 || Carp || 0 - 2 || Saito (3-3) || Hasebe (3-4) || Nagakawa (16) || 10,402 || 24-22-0
|-
| 47 || June 2 || Tigers ||  ||  ||  ||  ||  || 
|-
| 48 || June 3 || Tigers ||  ||  ||  ||  ||  || 
|-
| 49 || June 5 || @Swallows ||  ||  ||  ||  ||  || 
|-
| 50 || June 6 || @Swallows ||  ||  ||  ||  ||  || 
|-
| 51 || June 7 || @Giants ||  ||  ||  ||  ||  || 
|-
| 52 || June 8 || @Giants ||  ||  ||  ||  ||  || 
|-
| 53 || June 10 || Dragons ||  ||  ||  ||  ||  || 
|-
| 54 || June 11 || Dragons ||  ||  ||  ||  ||  || 
|-
| 55 || June 13 || BayStars ||  ||  ||  ||  ||  || 
|-
| 56 || June 14 || BayStars ||  ||  ||  ||  ||  || 
|-
| 57 || June 17 || @Carp ||  ||  ||  ||  ||  || 
|-
| 58 || June 18 || @Carp ||  ||  ||  ||  ||  || 
|-
| 59 || June 20 || @Tigers ||  ||  ||  ||  ||  || 
|-
| 60 || June 21 || @Tigers ||  ||  ||  ||  ||  || 
|-
| 61 || June 26 || @Buffaloes ||  ||  ||  ||  ||  || 
|-
| 62 || June 27 || @Buffaloes ||  ||  ||  ||  ||  || 
|-
| 63 || June 28 || @Buffaloes ||  ||  ||  ||  ||  || 
|-
| 64 || June 30 || @Fighters ||  ||  ||  ||  ||  || 
|-

|-
| 65 || July 1 || @Fighters ||  ||  ||  ||  ||  || 
|-
| 66 || July 2 || @Fighters ||  ||  ||  ||  ||  || 
|-
| 67 || July 3 || Lions ||  ||  ||  ||  ||  || 
|-
| 68 || July 4 || Lions ||  ||  ||  ||  ||  || 
|-
| 69 || July 5 || Lions ||  ||  ||  ||  ||  || 
|-
| 70 || July 7 || Marines ||  ||  ||  ||  ||  || 
|-
| 71 || July 8 || Marines ||  ||  ||  ||  ||  || 
|-
| 72 || July 9 || Marines ||  ||  ||  ||  ||  || 
|-
| 73 || July 10 || @Hawks ||  ||  ||  ||  ||  || 
|-
| 74 || July 11 || @Hawks ||  ||  ||  ||  ||  || 
|-
| 75 || July 12 || @Hawks ||  ||  ||  ||  ||  || 
|-
| 76 || July 14 || @Lions ||  ||  ||  ||  ||  || 
|-
| 77 || July 15 || @Lions ||  ||  ||  ||  ||  || 
|-
| 78 || July 16 || @Lions ||  ||  ||  ||  ||  || 
|-
| 79 || July 17 || Buffaloes ||  ||  ||  ||  ||  || 
|-
| 80 || July 18 || Buffaloes ||  ||  ||  ||  ||  || 
|-
| 81 || July 19 || Buffaloes ||  ||  ||  ||  ||  || 
|-
| 82 || July 20 || @Hawks ||  ||  ||  ||  ||  || 
|-
| 83 || July 21 || @Hawks ||  ||  ||  ||  ||  || 
|-
| 84 || July 22 || @Hawks ||  ||  ||  ||  ||  || 
|-
| 85 || July 28 || Lions ||  ||  ||  ||  ||  || 
|-
| 86 || July 29 || Lions ||  ||  ||  ||  ||  || 
|-
| 87 || July 31 || @Marines ||  ||  ||  ||  ||  || 
|-

|-
| 88 || August 1 || @Marines ||  ||  ||  ||  ||  || 
|-
| 89 || August 2 || @Marines ||  ||  ||  ||  ||  || 
|-
| 90 || August 4 || @Buffaloes ||  ||  ||  ||  ||  || 
|-
| 91 || August 5 || @Buffaloes ||  ||  ||  ||  ||  || 
|-
| 92 || August 6 || @Buffaloes ||  ||  ||  ||  ||  || 
|-
| 93 || August 7 || Fighters ||  ||  ||  ||  ||  || 
|-
| 94 || August 8 || Fighters ||  ||  ||  ||  ||  || 
|-
| 95 || August 9 || Fighters ||  ||  ||  ||  ||  || 
|-
| 96 || August 11 || Hawks ||  ||  ||  ||  ||  || 
|-
| 97 || August 12 || Hawks ||  ||  ||  ||  ||  || 
|-
| 98 || August 13 || Hawks ||  ||  ||  ||  ||  || 
|-
| 99 || August 14 || Marines ||  ||  ||  ||  ||  || 
|-
| 100 || August 15 || Marines ||  ||  ||  ||  ||  || 
|-
| 101 || August 16 || Marines ||  ||  ||  ||  ||  || 
|-
| 102 || August 18 || @Fighters ||  ||  ||  ||  ||  || 
|-
| 103 || August 19 || @Fighters ||  ||  ||  ||  ||  || 
|-
| 104 || August 20 || @Fighters ||  ||  ||  ||  ||  || 
|-
| 105 || August 21 || Buffaloes ||  ||  ||  ||  ||  || 
|-
| 106 || August 22 || Buffaloes ||  ||  ||  ||  ||  || 
|-
| 107 || August 23 || Buffaloes ||  ||  ||  ||  ||  || 
|-
| 108 || August 25 || @Lions ||  ||  ||  ||  ||  || 
|-
| 109 || August 26 || @Lions ||  ||  ||  ||  ||  || 
|-
| 110 || August 27 || @Lions ||  ||  ||  ||  ||  || 
|-
| 111 || August 28 || @Marines ||  ||  ||  ||  ||  || 
|-
| 112 || August 29 || @Marines ||  ||  ||  ||  ||  || 
|-
| 113 || August 30 || @Marines ||  ||  ||  ||  ||  || 
|-

|-
| 114 || September 1 || Lions ||  ||  ||  ||  ||  || 
|-
| 115 || September 2 || Lions ||  ||  ||  ||  ||  || 
|-
| 116 || September 3 || Lions ||  ||  ||  ||  ||  || 
|-
| 117 || September 4 || Fighters ||  ||  ||  ||  ||  || 
|-
| 118 || September 5 || Fighters ||  ||  ||  ||  ||  || 
|-
| 119 || September 6 || Fighters ||  ||  ||  ||  ||  || 
|-
| 120 || September 8 || @Buffaloes ||  ||  ||  ||  ||  || 
|-
| 121 || September 9 || @Buffaloes ||  ||  ||  ||  ||  || 
|-
| 122 || September 10 || @Buffaloes ||  ||  ||  ||  ||  || 
|-
| 123 || September 11 || @Hawks ||  ||  ||  ||  ||  || 
|-
| 124 || September 12 || @Hawks ||  ||  ||  ||  ||  || 
|-
| 125 || September 13 || @Hawks ||  ||  ||  ||  ||  || 
|-
| 126 || September 15 || @Fighters ||  ||  ||  ||  ||  || 
|-
| 127 || September 16 || @Fighters ||  ||  ||  ||  ||  || 
|-
| 128 || September 17 || @Fighters ||  ||  ||  ||  ||  || 
|-
| 129 || September 18 || Marines ||  ||  ||  ||  ||  || 
|-
| 130 || September 19 || Marines ||  ||  ||  ||  ||  || 
|-
| 131 || September 20 || Marines ||  ||  ||  ||  ||  || 
|-
| 132 || September 21 || Buffaloes ||  ||  ||  ||  ||  || 
|-
| 133 || September 22 || Buffaloes ||  ||  ||  ||  ||  || 
|-
| 134 || September 23 || Buffaloes ||  ||  ||  ||  ||  || 
|-
| 135 || September 25 || @Lions ||  ||  ||  ||  ||  || 
|-
| 136 || September 26 || @Lions ||  ||  ||  ||  ||  || 
|-
| 137 || September 27 || @Lions ||  ||  ||  ||  ||  || 
|-
| 138 || September 29 || Hawks ||  ||  ||  ||  ||  || 
|-
| 139 || September 30 || Hawks ||  ||  ||  ||  ||  || 
|-

|-
| 140 || October 1 || Hawks ||  ||  ||  ||  ||  || 
|-
| 141 || October 3 || Lions ||  ||  ||  ||  ||  || 
|-
| 142 || October 5 || @Buffaloes ||  ||  ||  ||  ||  || 
|-

|-
| Legend:       = Win       = Loss       = Tie       = PostponementBold = Eagles team member

Player stats

Batting

Pitching

References

Tohoku Rakuten Golden Eagles
Tohoku Rakuten Golden Eagles seasons